Santana IV is the twenty-fourth studio album (thirty eighth album overall) by American rock band Santana, released in April 2016.

Overview
The album reunited most of the surviving members from the early 1970s lineup of the band (including Carlos Santana, Gregg Rolie, Neal Schon, Mike Carabello and Michael Shrieve) and was the first time that the quintet had recorded together since 1971's Santana III. Timbalist José Areas was not invited to participate. Joining these "core" members were later Santana members Karl Perazzo (percussion) and Benny Rietveld (bass), with vocalist Ronald Isley guesting on two cuts. Santana IV included 16 new tracks written and produced by the band.

Origins
The origins for the reunion go back several years, when Schon suggested that he and Carlos Santana record together. Santana liked the idea but went on to suggest that they recruit Rolie, Shrieve and Carabello for what would be called Santana IV (picking up where they left off on Santana III). After initial writing sessions and rehearsals took place in 2013, the group recorded throughout 2014 and 2015, resulting in 16 new tracks that combined their signature elements of Afro-Latin rhythms, vocals, blues-psychedelic guitar solos, and percussion work.

Santana said, of the restored lineup: "It was magical, we didn't have to try to force the vibe – it was immense. From there, we then needed to come up with a balance of songs and jams that people would immediately identify as classic Santana."

Promotion
The first single from Santana IV, entitled "Anywhere You Want to Go", was released on February 5, 2016.

Commercial performance
In the United States, Santana IV debuted at number 5 on the Billboard 200, with 42,000 album-equivalent units; it sold 40,000 copies in its first week. Santana IV became Santana's fourteenth top ten album on the Billboard 200.

Track listing
Writing credits and songs' lengths are in accord with album's inner notes.

Personnel
Santana
 Carlos Santana – guitar, vocals
 Neal Schon – guitar, vocals
 Gregg Rolie – lead vocals, Hammond B3 organ, keyboards
 Benny Rietveld – bass
 Michael Shrieve – drums
 Michael Carabello – congas, percussion, backing vocals
 Karl Perazzo – timbales, percussion, vocals

Guest musician
 Ronald Isley – lead vocals (5, 6)

Technical
Jim Reitzel - engineer, mixing
Carlos Santana - mixing, production
Heather Griffin-Vine, Michael Carabello - cover

Charts

Weekly charts

Year-end charts

References 

Santana (band) albums
2016 albums
Albums produced by Carlos Santana